Milestones is a 1975 American drama film directed by Robert Kramer and John Douglas.

Plot
A many-faceted portrait of those individuals who sought radical solutions to social problems in the United States during the 1960s and 1970s. It cuts back and forth between six major story lines and more than fifty characters, and across a vast landscape, to explore the lifestyles and attitudes of the American left who faced both personal and historical transitions in the period following the Vietnam War."

Cast
 Mary Chapelle - Mama
 Sharon Krebs - Jane
 Jim Nolfi - Jimmy
 Grace Paley - Helen
 Susie Solf - Karen
 David C. Stone - Joe
 Joe Stork - Larry
 Paul Zimet - Peter

See also
 List of American films of 1975

References

External links
 https://www.imdb.com/title/tt0073389/

1975 films
1975 drama films
American drama films
1970s English-language films
1970s American films